Terry Don Phillips is an American former college athletics administrator. He served as the athletic director at Liberty Baptist College—now known as Liberty University—from 1980 to 1981, at the University of Southwestern Louisiana—now known as the University of Louisiana at Lafayette—from  1983 to 1988, at Oklahoma State University from 1995 to 2002, and at Clemson University from 2002 to 2012.

Playing and coaching career
Phillips played defensive tackle at Arkansas from 1966 to 1969.  He remained at Arkansas as a graduate assistant for the 1970 and 1971 seasons, before moving to Virginia Tech as an assistant coach.  Phillips left Virginia Tech after 1978.

Administrative career
In 1980, Phillips became athletic director at Liberty University.  He moved to Louisiana–Lafayette in 1983, before returning to his alma mater, Arkansas, in 1988 as Senior Associate Athletic Director.

Phillips stayed at Arkansas until 1994, and then left for the AD job at Oklahoma State once it became apparent that then-Arkansas AD Frank Broyles had no intention of retiring. Under Phillips, the Cowboys basketball team continued their success under coach Eddie Sutton, reaching the NCAA Final Four in 1995 and the Elite Eight in 2000.  In football, Phillips hired coach Les Miles in 2001, who would turn the program around and lead the team to 3 straight bowl bids after Phillips left the school.

In 2002 Phillips left Oklahoma State for Clemson.  There, he has overseen the hiring of basketball coaches Oliver Purnell in 2003 and Brad Brownell in 2010.  He also promoted Dabo Swinney to head football coach and oversaw the "WestZone" expansion of Memorial Stadium in 2006.

Phillips was inducted into the University of Arkansas Sports Hall of Honor in 2010.

Phillips retired from Clemson University in 2012.

References

Year of birth missing (living people)
Living people
American football defensive tackles
Arkansas Razorbacks football players
Arkansas Razorbacks football coaches
Clemson Tigers athletic directors
Liberty Flames and Lady Flames athletic directors
Louisiana Ragin' Cajuns athletic directors
Oklahoma State Cowboys and Cowgirls athletic directors
Virginia Tech Hokies football coaches